Be My Thrill is the fourth full-length album released by The Weepies. It was released on Nettwerk Records on August 31, 2010. Three promotional singles, "I Was Made For Sunny Days", "Be My Thrill", and "Please Speak Well of Me", were released through the iTunes Store in the weeks leading up to the album's release.

The album debuted at number 34 on the U.S. Billboard 200 chart, selling 11,000 copies in its first week.  It has sold 50,000 copies in the US as of April 2015.

Track listing

Charts

References

External links 
 

The Weepies albums
2010 albums
Folk-pop albums